Mauri Vanhanen (born 1 June 1931) is a Finnish footballer. He played in three matches for the Finland national football team in 1957.

References

External links
 

1931 births
Living people
Finnish footballers
Finland international footballers
Place of birth missing (living people)
Association footballers not categorized by position